New Hampshire's 20th State Senate district is one of 24 districts in the New Hampshire Senate. It has  been represented by Democrat Lou D'Allesandro since 1998; D'Allesandro is currently the longest-serving member of the body.

Geography
The district is based in Manchester, including the city's 2nd, 3rd, 4th, 10th, 11th & 12th wards, in Hillsborough County. The district is located entirely within New Hampshire's 1st congressional district.

Federal and statewide results in District 20 
Results are of elections held under 2022 district lines.

Recent election results

Historical election results 
The following result occurred prior to 2022 redistricting, and thus were held under different district lines.

2020

2018

2016

2014

2012

References

20
Hillsborough County, New Hampshire